Union of Independent Trade Unions may mean:

 Union of Independent Trade Unions (Portugal)
 United Independent Albanian Trade Unions